Cattown is a hamlet located at the corner of Cattown  and Hoke Roads in the Town of Otsego, New York, in Otsego County, United States. It is west of Fly Creek and north of Oaksville. The hamlet was named Cattown because a girl's husband dropped a cat down a chimney of a house to break up a meeting she was attending because his dinner was late.

References

Hamlets in Otsego County, New York